The 1940 Toronto Argonauts season was the 54th season for the team since the franchise's inception in 1873. The team finished in second place in the Interprovincial Rugby Football Union with a 4–2 record and qualified for the playoffs, but lost the two-game total-points IRFU Final series to the Ottawa Rough Riders.

Preseason

Regular season

Standings

Schedule

Postseason

References

Toronto Argonauts seasons